Laura Hilgermann (born Laura Oberländer, married Laura Rosenberg or Laura Hilgermann-Radó; 13 October 1869 in Vienna, (Austria-Hungary) – 9 February 1945 in Budapest, Hungarian Empire) was an Austro-Hungarian operatic singer (soprano and contralto) then singing teacher.

Students 
 Gitta Alpár
 Anton Arnold
 Charlotte Eisler
 Maria von Ilosvay
 Maria Nemeth
 Enid Szánthó

Sources 
 Ludwig Eisenberg: Großes biographisches Lexikon der Deutschen Bühne im XIX. Jahrhundert. Edited by Paul Liszt, Leipzig 1903, p. 434,.
 
 Felix Czeike (publisher): Hilgermann, Laura. In Oesterreichisches Musiklexikon. Volume 3, Kremayr & Scheriau, Vienna 1994, 
 Laura Hilgermann on OeML

External links 
 Laura Hilgermann on Operissimo
 Performances with Laura Hilgermann on Wiener Staasoper
 Laura Hilgermann on WiWi
 Laura Hilgermann Recording in the archives of the Österreichische Mediathek: ("Kirchengesangsszene der Ortrud" excerpt from Lohengrin)
 

Austro-Hungarian singers
Austrian operatic sopranos
Operatic contraltos
19th-century Austrian  women opera singers
20th-century Austrian  women  opera singers
Voice teachers
1869 births
1945 deaths
Musicians from Vienna